Hywel Islwyn Davies (called Islwyn) was an Anglican priest in the mid 20th century.

Born on 14 February 1909 and educated at Gowerton Grammar School and Gonville and Caius College, Cambridge, he was ordained in 1936. After a curacy in Merthyr Tydfil he was a Lecturer at St David’s College, Lampeter. In 1953 he contributed an historical article to Cyngres yr Eglwys yng Nghymru 1953 - Congress of the Church in Wales. He held incumbencies at Llanstephan, Llanbadarn Fawr and then Llanelli before being appointed Dean of Bangor in 1957. In 1961 he joined the staff of the University of Ife and was Professor of Philosophy of Religion there from 1966 to 1969. He was Rector of Collyweston from 1969 to 1976. He died on 19 February 1981.

References

People educated at Gowerton Grammar School
Alumni of Gonville and Caius College, Cambridge
Academics of the University of Wales, Lampeter
Academic staff of Obafemi Awolowo University
Deans of Bangor
1909 births
1981 deaths
British expatriates in Nigeria